Itan may refer to:
The Yoruba mythology (traditional history, folklore and philosophy) of the Yoruba people
 Itan, a trade name used in Chile for a medication (Metoclopramide) used to treat digestive problems
iTAN,  Indexed Transaction authentication number